Chief may refer to:

Title or rank

Military and law enforcement 
 Chief master sergeant, the ninth, and highest, enlisted rank in the U.S. Air Force and U.S. Space Force
 Chief of police, the head of a police department
 Chief of the boat, the senior enlisted sailor on a U.S. Navy submarine
 Chief petty officer, a non-commissioned officer or equivalent in many navies
 Chief warrant officer, a military rank

Other titles 
 Chief of the Name, head of a family or clan
 Chief mate, or Chief officer, the highest senior officer in the deck department on a merchant vessel
 Chief of staff,  the leader of a complex organization 
 Fire chief, top rank in a fire department
 Scottish clan chief, the head of a Scottish clan
 Tribal chief, a leader of a tribal form of government
 Chief, IRS-CI, the head and chief executive of U.S. Internal Revenue Service, Criminal Investigation

Places 
 Chief Mountain, Montana, United States
 Stawamus Chief or the Chief, a granite dome in British Columbia, Canada

People with the name or nickname

Athletes 
 Chief Bender (1884–1954), American Major League Baseball (MLB) pitcher
 Sheldon "Chief" Bender (1919–2008) American Major League scouting director and farm system director
 Big Chief Bonner, college football player and engineer
 Chief Chouneau (1888–1946), American MLB pitcher and member of the Fond du Lac Band of Lake Superior
 Peter Graham (fighter) (born 1975), "The Chief", Australian kickboxer, boxer and mixed martial artist
 Elon Hogsett (1903–2001), American MLB pitcher
 Chief Johnson (1886–1922), American MLB pitcher
 Chief Jones (1879–1959), American professional ice hockey goaltender
 Chief Kickingstallionsims (born 1986), American basketball player
 Chief Meyers (1880–1971), American MLB catcher
 Robert Parish "The Chief" (born 1953), American basketball player
 Chief Roseman (1856–1938), American Major League Baseball player from Brooklyn 
 Alfred Michael "Chief" Venne (1879–1971), a Native American educator, athletic manager and coach
 Chief Wilson (1883–1954), American MLB outfielder
 Chief Youngblood (1900–1968), American MLB pitcher
 Chief Zimmer (1860–1949), American MLB catcher

Other people with the name or nickname
 C. Alfred "Chief" Anderson (1907–1996), American aviator known as "the Father of Black Aviation"
 Chief Bey (1913–2004), American jazz percussionist and African folklorist
 Éamon de Valera (1882-1975), nicknamed "The Chief", Irish republican leader
 John Diefenbaker, known as "The Chief" (1895–1979), Canadian Prime Minister
 Chief Keef (born 1995), stage name of American rapper and record producer Keith Farrelle Cozart

Animals
 Chief (horse)
 Amauris echeria or chief, a butterfly of southern Africa

Arts, entertainment, and media

Fictional characters
 Carl "Chief" Kanisky, a character on the American television sitcom Gimme a Break
 Chief (Battlestar Galactica) or Galen Tyrol, a character in Battlestar Galactica
 Chief (DC Comics), the leader of the Doom Patrol
 Chief, a character in The Fox and the Hound
 Master Chief (Halo) or Chief, a character in Halo
 The Chief, a character in Get Smart
 The Chief, a character in the Carmen Sandiego franchise
 The Chief, a character in The Plastic Man Comedy/Adventure Show
 The Chief, a character in T.U.F.F. Puppy

Literature
 Chiefs (novel), a 1981 novel by Stuart Woods
 The Chief (play), a 2003 one-man play about Art Rooney

Music 
 Chief (album), a 2011 album by Eric Church
 Chief (band), a folk rock band from 2008 to 2011
 Chief Records, a record label from 1957 to 1964
 The Chief (album), a 2017 album by Jidenna

Periodicals
 Chief (magazine), a defunct online arts and culture publication
 The Chief (New York newspaper), a newspaper in New York City
 The Chief (Oregon newspaper), a newspaper in northwestern Oregon, United States

Film and television
 The Chief (film), a 1933 American comedy
 Chiefs (miniseries), a 1983 miniseries starring Charlton Heston and Keith Carradine
 The Chief (TV series), a 1990s British crime drama
 The Chiefs (TV program), a Philippine television talk show
 Chiefs, a 2002 documentary feature by Daniel Junge about the Wyoming Indian High School basketball team

Sports

Organizations and teams
Chiefs Esports Club, an esports organisation in Australia
Chiefs (rugby union), a rugby union team in New Zealand
Allentown Chiefs, a former  minor league baseball team
Arellano Chiefs, the athletic team of Arellano University
Atlanta Chiefs, a soccer team based in Atlanta, Georgia
Exeter Chiefs, a rugby union team in England
Hartford Chiefs, a former minor league baseball franchise representing Hartford, Connecticut
Johnstown Chiefs, a former ice hockey team in Pennsylvania that took its name from the fictional Charlestown Chiefs from the film Slap Shot
Lakefield Chiefs, a Canadian Junior ice hockey team based in Lakefield, Ontario, Canada
Laval Chiefs, an ice hockey team in Quebec
Kaizer Chiefs F.C., a football club in South Africa
Kansas City Chiefs, an American football team in Missouri
Mississauga Chiefs, a former professional women's ice hockey team from Mississauga, Ontario, Canada
Mississauga Jr. Chiefs, a Canadian Junior women's ice hockey team based in Mississauga, Ontario
Motor City Chiefs, a former ice hockey organization from Dearborn Heights, Michigan
Paducah Chiefs, a minor league baseball team from Paducah, Kentucky
Peoria Chiefs, a minor league baseball affiliate in Peoria, Illinois of the Chicago Cubs
South City Chiefs, an American football club competing in the South Australian Gridiron Association league
Spokane Chiefs, a Western Hockey League ice hockey team from Spokane, Washington
Syracuse Chiefs, a AAA minor league baseball team in upstate New York
Wenatchee Chiefs, a former minor league baseball team based in Wenatchee, Washington

In fiction
 Charlestown Chiefs, a fictional ice hockey team in Slap Shot

Transport
 Chief (train), a named passenger train of the Atchison, Topeka and Santa Fe Railway
 Southwest Chief Amtrak's successor service to the Chief and Super Chief
 Super Chief, premium passenger train of the Atchison, Topeka and Santa Fe Railway 
 Aeronca 11 Chief, an American two-seat airplane entering production in 1945
 Aeronca 50 Chief, an American light plane of the late 1930s
 Pawnee Chief, an American two-seat helicopter design, first flown in 2005

United States Navy ships 
 USS Chief (AMc-67), an Accentor-class minesweeper that served from 1942 until 1945
 USS Chief (AM-31), an Auk-class minesweeper that served from 1943 until 1955
 USS Chief (MCM-14), an Avenger-class mine countermeasures ship commissioned in 1994

Other uses 
 Chief (heraldry), a horizontal band on a coat of arms
 Customs Handling of Import & Export Freight (CHIEF), a UK customs computer system

See also 
 Chieftain (disambiguation)
 Super Chief (disambiguation)

Lists of people by nickname